The highest-selling singles in Japan are ranked in the Oricon Weekly Chart, which is published by Oricon Style magazine. The data are compiled by Oricon based on each singles' weekly physical sales. In 2009, 51 singles reached the peak of the chart.

Sisters Kumi Koda and Misono's "It's All Love!" made them the fourth group of siblings to have a number one on the charts. However, they are the first siblings to have a number one debut on the charts in its initial week. Enka singer Junko Akimoto's  makes her the oldest singer at the age of 61 years to have a number one single. The record was previously held by Kazumasa Oda's  which was released in 2007. Korean pop boy band TVXQ's "Share the World/We Are!" debut at number-one on the charts, making them first foreign artist to have six number one singles in Japan.

Rock boy band KAT-TUN's "Rescue" makes them the third group to ten consecutive number one singles since their debut. KinKi Kids'  extended their record for having the most consecutive number one singles since their debut. They also extended their Oricon record for having a number one single for 13 consecutive years since their debut. Pop singer Ayumi Hamasaki's "Rule/Sparkle" makes her the only solo female artist and the first female artist to have 20 consecutive singles to debut at number one. R&B singer Namie Amuro's Wild/Dr. debuted atop of the charts and made her the only female artist to have a top ten single each year for 15 years.  is Aiko's first number one single in her 11-year career.

Pop boy band NEWS'  makes them the second group to have 11 consecutive number one singles since their debut. Pop boy band Arashi's "Believe/Kumorinochi, Kaisei" and "Ashita no Kioku/Crazy Moon (Kimi wa Muteki)" are the first singles in seven years to sell over 500,000 copies consecutively with first week sales. This feat was last achieved by Keisuke Kuwata in 2001.

Chart history

References

2009 in Japanese music
Japan
Lists of number-one songs in Japan